Toward the End of Time is a novel by American writer John Updike, published in 1997. It is the author's 18th novel.

Plot summary

Set in New England, like many of Updike's novels, Toward the End of Time portrays a world in which the Chinese and the Americans have attacked one another with nuclear weapons. The aftermath is shown through retired investment advisor Ben Turnbull's journal. Though the dollar and the central government are gone, life in Boston and the surrounding areas goes on thanks to FedEx and other less reputable entrepreneurs. The book is divided into five parts: i. The Deer ii. The Dollhouse iii. The Deal iv. The Deaths v. The Dahlia.

i. The Deer

Ben expresses his uneasiness about his second wife, Gloria's, obsession with killing the deer who is ravaging her picture-perfect garden. Clearly unhappy with Gloria, Ben begins an affair with a prostitute named Deirdre.

ii. The Dollhouse

Ben believes he has slid into an alternate universe when Gloria disappears and Deirdre takes her place. Ben has the vague impression he may have shot and killed Gloria. Spin and Phil, young thugs who collect protection money from Ben, clash with Deirdre, who takes a more and more authoritative role in the house.

iii. The Deal

Deirdre leaves Ben for Phil, and Gloria returns. Ben is relieved that he did not shoot Gloria, and admits that the house and garden flourish under her influence. Spin is killed by a group of younger children who set up house in the woods behind Ben's house and supplant Spin and Phil in the collection business. Ben helps them establish local legitimacy in exchange for commissions on their earnings and sexual favors from their young female companion, Doreen.

iv. The Deaths

Ben discovers he has prostate cancer. During his long hospital stay, Gloria hires FedEx  — for whom Phil is now working — to get rid of the residents of the makeshift house. Creatures called Metallobioforms designed to clear away large tracts of land for human exploitation are used to raze the house. Ben sees evidence that they also devoured and killed the young people. He is left as impotent to protest Gloria's cruelty as he was left physically impotent by the prostate surgery.

v. The Dahlia

Gloria's hired deer hunter shoots and kills the young doe who has been nibbling their garden. Ben cannot participate in Gloria's triumph or the deer hunter's communion with nature. Ben regains some control of his bladder, but this is not enough to erase the impression that he has become a ghost wandering around in his own house.

Critical reception
In a review for the New York Observer entitled, "John Updike, Champion Literary Phallocrat, Drops One; Is This Finally the End for Magnificent Narcissists?" (later published in Consider the Lobster), novelist David Foster Wallace wrote a scathing critique of Toward the End of Time. Wallace wrote: 
 
Wallace quotes literary readers he knows who characterize Updike "just a penis with a thesaurus." Aside from its protagonist, who, Wallace argues, is fundamentally unlikable, the novel's prose is so "turgid" that it distracts "us with worries about whether Mr. Updike might be injured or ill." Wallace concludes:

In contrast, Margaret Atwood wrote a very positive review of Toward the End of Time for the New York Times, "Memento Mori--But First, Carpe Diem."  She praises Updike's "brilliant metaphors" and describes the central character Ben Turnbull in his semi-idyllic, upper class rural home as "a Thoreau run through the meat grinder of the 20th century." She notes his frequent brutality (both towards himself and others), but also notes his rueful, evenhanded powers of observation that "[fall] alike on everything: on flowers, animals, grandchildren, corpses, copulations; on ancient Egypt and plastic peanuts; on memory, disgust, dread, lust and spiritual rapture."  She ends with the claim that "As memento mori and its obverse, carpe diem, Toward the End of Time could scarcely be bettered." 

Critic James Wood was dismissive, as he is of much of Updike's work, calling it 'a deeply misogynistic moan'.

References

1997 American novels
Novels by John Updike
Alfred A. Knopf books
FedEx in fiction
Fiction set in 2020
Post-apocalyptic fiction